Thomas John Palmer (July 13, 1941 – August 18, 2022) was an American comic book artist best known as an inker for Marvel Comics.

Biography
Although Tom Palmer created a small amount of penciling work (as well as some cover art and some coloring), the vast majority of his artistic output since the 1960s was as a comic book inker. Reminiscing about how he came to be an inker, Palmer recounted:

Palmer's extensive work for Marvel Comics includes runs paired with pencilers Neal Adams on The Avengers and Uncanny X-Men; Gene Colan, on titles such as Doctor Strange, Daredevil, and Tomb of Dracula; and John Buscema, on The Avengers. He also inked the entire run of John Byrne's X-Men: The Hidden Years.

Palmer is widely considered the definitive inker for Gene Colan, whose use of grey textures made his pencils notoriously difficult to ink in a way that did them justice. Colan has stated publishers never answered his requests to be paired with a specific inker. Palmer reasoned that, "I think the way we both worked in the business, we had a book to get out every month, bills to pay, and somehow we were put together as a team. We could have been forgotten and ignored, and we'd not be sitting here today. But somehow, I think, the fans have brought us to this point of recognition."

Palmer's brushy, detailed, and illustrative inking style hearkens back to vintage newspaper comic strips like Steve Canyon and Tarzan, and has influenced later generations of inkers like Klaus Janson, Josef Rubinstein, and Bob McLeod.

Palmer's son Tom Palmer Jr. is a comic book professional who had a long-running column, Palmer's Picks, in the now defunct Wizard Magazine: The Price Guide to Comics and he was also an editor for DC Comics.

Palmer died on August 18, 2022, at the age of 81.

Awards 
In addition to the awards below, Palmer was also named the #3 Inker of American Comics by Atlas Comics.

 1969 Alley Award
 1975 "Favorite Inker" Comic Fan Art Award
 2008 "Favorite Finisher/Embellisher" Inkwell Award 
 2014 "The Joe Sinnott Hall of Fame Award" Inkwell Award

Selected bibliography

Marvel Comics

The Amazing Spider-Man Annual (Vol. 1) #14 (inker) (1981)

The Avengers (Vol. 1) #75-96, 257-262, 291–299, Annual #17, 300, 400 (inker) (1985–1996)

Captain America (Vol. 3) #50 (penciler, with John Romita Sr., Bruce Timm, Ron Frenz, Sal Buscema and Rick Veitch) (2002)

Doctor Strange (Vol. 2) #6, 8-18, 36–45, 47 (inker), 171 (penciler), 172-183 (inker) (1975–1981)

Giant-Size Man-Thing (Vol. 1) #5 (inker) (1975)

Marvel Super-Heroes (Vol. 1) #23 (penciler) (1969)

 Star Wars (Vol. 1) (cover artist) #1-3, 46, 50, 57, 63, 65-91, 100 (penciler) # 10, 63, 65, 70, 87 (inker); #8-10, 46, 49–63, 65–94 (1981–1985) Luke Skywalker: The Rise of a Hero (2017)

Spider-Man Unlimited (Vol. 1) #7 (penciler, with Ron Lim and Phil Gosier) (1994)The Incredible Hulk (Vol. 2) #25, #27-28, #30-32, #34-43, #75, #77-81, #95 (inker) (2001-2006)The Tomb of Dracula (Vol. 1) #1–70 (inker) (1973-1979)Thor (Vol. 1) #272-277, #280 (inker) (1978-1979)Uncanny X-Men (Vol. 1) #56-65; 73, 281–285, 288 (inker) (1969-1992)X-Men: The Hidden Years (Vol. 1) #1–22 (inker) (1999–2001)

DC ComicsAction Comics #447, 800 (1975, 2003)The 

Adventures of Superman #458, 526, 539 

(1989–1996)Atari Force #14 (1985)Batgirl #30 (2002)Batman #343–345, 

348, 553–554, 80-Page Giant #1 (1982–1998)The Batman Adventures Annual'' #1 

(1994)
Action Comics Vol 1 749
Adventure Comics 80-Page Giant Vol 1 1
Adventure Comics 80-Page Giant Vol 2 1
Adventures of Superman Vol 1 563
Adventures of Superman Vol 1 564
Adventures of Superman Vol 1 570
Adventures of Superman Vol 1 571
All-Star Batman Vol 1 5

The Batman Chronicles Gallery Vol 1 1
Batman Secret Files and Origins Vol 1 1

Batman Versus Bane (Collected)
Batman Villains Secret Files and Origins Vol 1 1

Batman: Bane of the Demon Vol 1 1
Batman: Bane of the Demon Vol 1 2
Batman: Bane of the Demon Vol 1 3
Batman: Bane of the Demon Vol 1 4
Batman: Black & White, Vol. 1 (Collected)
Batman: Black & White, Vol. 2 (Collected)
Batman: Bullock's Law Vol 1 1
Batman: Bullock's Law Vol 2 1
Batman: Gotham Knights Vol 1 15
Batman: Knightfall Vol. 1 (Collected)
Batman: Knightfall Vol. 2 (Collected)
Batman: Legacy Vol. 1 (Collected)
Batman: Legacy Vol. 2 (Collected)
Batman: Road to No Man's Land Vol. 1 

(Collected)
Batman: Road to No Man's Land Vol. 1 

(Collected)
Batman: Two Faces Vol 1 1
Batman: Two Faces Vol 1 2

Catwoman/Wildcat Vol 1 1
Catwoman/Wildcat Vol 1 2
Catwoman/Wildcat Vol 1 3
Catwoman/Wildcat Vol 1 4
Cyborg Vol 1 2
Cyborg Vol 1 2

Detective Comics Vol 1 704
Detective Comics Vol 1 725

References

External links
 
 
 

1941 births
2022 deaths
American comics artists
Silver Age comics creators
Marvel Comics people
Inkpot Award winners